Grant Steven Musgrove (born 28 March 1968) is an Australian public figure. Roles have included Chief Executive Officer of the Australian Council of Recycling (ACOR), the peak industry body for the resource recovery industry. He is a regular media commentator and keynote speaker on resource recovery and the recycling industry internationally. He was the member for Springwood in the Legislative Assembly of Queensland from 1998 to 2001, representing the Labor Party.

At Griffith University, Musgrove completed a Bachelor of Commerce, majoring in Economics, and a Bachelor of Science, majoring in Environmental Planning. He started his career in landfill re-mediation, before becoming a policy officer in the Department of Premier and Cabinet in 1992. In 1996, he resigned from the public service to a take a position as an economic and environmental issue management consultant.

In 1998, Musgrove was elected as the Labor member for Springwood. He secured the largest swing to a government member in the 1998 Queensland state election (11%) and was elected as its youngest member. His victory, on a narrow margin of 1%, enabled the formation of the first Beattie minority government. Musgrove was appointed to the Queensland Innovation Council (developing the Queensland Innovation Strategy), the Queensland Public Works Committee, and as chair of several Budget Estimates Committees. He quit from parliament after campaigning against stacking while both a member of parliament, providing testimony to an inquiry that there was a culture of branch stacking in politics. 

Musgrove went on to work as a government relations consultant then as Senior Adviser in the Chancellery at Griffith University. He serves on number of boards, councils, expert government committees and advisory boards in relation to resource recovery and resource efficiency, and is a Member of the Australian Institute of Company Directors. He has served as a board member of the following associations:
 National Packaging Covenant Industry Association
 Founder of circulareconomy.org.au
 NSW Business and Financial Model Working Group
 Sustainability Victoria Integrated Waste Management Expert Reference Group
 Queensland Container Deposits Scheme Advisory Group
 Queensland Energy from Waste Working Group
 United Nations Centre for Regional Development: International Partnership for Expanding Waste Management Services of Local Authorities

As a chief executive officer of ACOR, Musgrove has been a regular media commentator in The Courier-Mail, the Business Environment Network, and on ABC Radio, discussing issues related to the resource recovery industry. '

References

1968 births
Living people
Independent members of the Parliament of Queensland
Members of the Queensland Legislative Assembly
Australian Labor Party members of the Parliament of Queensland
21st-century Australian politicians